Chang may refer to:

People

Surname 
 Chang (surname), the romanization of several separate Chinese surnames
 Chang or Jang (Korean name), romanizations of the Korean surname

Given name 
 Chang Bunker (1811–1874), one of the original Siamese twins
 Liu Chang (disambiguation)
 Chang, the younger brother in the children's book Tikki Tikki Tembo
 Chang (Star Trek), a Klingon general from the film Star Trek VI: The Undiscovered Country
 Chang Koehan, a Korean character from The King of Fighters
 Benjamin Chang, a Chinese character from Community

Pseudonym 
 Chang (director) (born Yoon Hong-seung, 1975), a South Korean film director

Ethnography 
 Chang Naga, a tribe of Tuensang in Nagaland, India
 Chang language, spoken by the Chang Naga

Places
 Chang, Bhiwani, a village in the Indian state of Haryana
 Chang, Iran, a village in Hormozgan Province of Iran

Other uses 

 Chang, chaang, or chhaang, a traditional alcoholic barley drink of Tibet
 Chang (Thai beer), a Thai brand of beer by ThaiBev
 Chang (film), a 1927 film
 Chang (roller coaster), a roller coaster formerly at Kentucky Kingdom
 Chang (instrument), a Persian harp
 Chang (creature), the ghost of a person eaten by a tiger in ancient Chinese legend
 Chang, or Chinese chang, an alternative name for the fangxiang, a type of metallophone
 Chang Arena, a football stadium in Buriram, Thailand
 Chang number in mathematics
 Chang or zhàng, a Chinese customary unit of length
 Chang dance, a folk dance in India
 Chang International Circuit, a motorsport race track in Buriram, Thailand

See also
 Chang'e (disambiguation)